Lin Li-hui (born 16 April 1976), better known by her stage name Shu Qi, is a Hong Kong-Taiwanese actress and model. , she was among the highest paid actresses in China.

Shu ranked 18th on Forbes China Celebrity 100 list in 2013, 23rd in 2014, 32nd in 2015, 48th in 2017, and 90th in 2019.

Early life
Born in Xindian township, Taipei County (now New Taipei City), Shu Qi went to Hong Kong at the age of 17 to seek a film career. She eventually came under the management of Hong Kong film producer Manfred Wong, who signed her to several Hong Kong Category III films such as Sex & Zen II (1996).

Career

Shu Qi starred in Derek Yee's 1996 film Viva Erotica, about the erotic film industry in Hong Kong, with Karen Mok and Leslie Cheung. She received the Best Supporting Actress award for her performance in Viva Erotica at the 16th Hong Kong Film Awards in 1997. She has since appeared in Hong Kong films such as Portland Street Blues (1998), City of Glass (1998), the box office hit Gorgeous (1999), Stanley Kwan's The Island Tales (1999) and Hou Hsiao-hsien's Millennium Mambo (2001), making her transition into mainstream acting.

In 2002, Shu starred in the French film The Transporter, the first installment of the Transporter franchise. This marked her first foray into the American market. In 2008 she had a small but memorable role in the American romantic comedy New York, I Love You.

Among Shu's earlier notable works were The Foliage (2004), a romance film set in Yunnan during the Cultural Revolution. She won the Best Actress award at the 13th Shanghai Film Critics Awards for her performance. Shu worked with Hou again in Three Times (2005), which competed at the Cannes Film Festival and won Shu the Best Actress award at the Golden Horse Awards.

In 2006, Shu starred in the third installment of the gangster film My Wife Is a Gangster alongside Korean actor Lee Beom-soo. She also starred alongside Tony Leung Chiu-wai and Takeshi Kaneshiro in the crime drama Confession of Pain.

Shu was a member of the jury of the Berlin International Film Festival in 2008 and the Cannes Film Festival in 2009. The same year, she was honored at the Huabiao Awards as Best Actress for the Taiwan and Hong Kong region for her performance in the romantic comedy film If You Are the One, directed by Feng Xiaogang. The romantic comedy was the highest-grossing Chinese film of the year.

Shu starred in Journey to the West: Conquering the Demons (2013), directed by Stephen Chow and loosely based on the Chinese literary classic Journey to the West. The film overtook Lost in Thailand to become the highest-grossing Chinese movie.

Shu reunited with Hou in his first wuxia film, The Assassin (2015), starring as the title character. The film received overwhelmingly positive reviews at the Cannes Film Festival, and Shu won the Best Actress award at the Asian Film Festival. The same year, she starred in the blockbuster film Mojin: The Lost Legend,
adapted from popular adventure novel series Ghost Blows Out the Light.

In 2016, Shu, Feng Shaofeng and Victoria Song starred in the Chinese remake of My Best Friend's Wedding. She was also cast in fantasy comedy The Village of No Return, which premiered at the first day of Spring Festival in 2017. In 2017, Shu starred in Stephen Fung's The Adventurers alongside Jean Reno and Andy Lau.

Shu appears in the 2019 science fiction film Shanghai Fortress, adapted from the 2006 novel Once Upon a Time in Shanghai.

Other activities

From 2006 to 2009, Shu was selected by Kenzo Takada to be part of the third advertising campaign for its successful fragrance Flower by Kenzo. She also worked as a spokesperson for Shiatzy Chen.

Shu has been representing Frederique Constant in Asia as a brand ambassador since 2008. In 2009, she, along with Frederique Constant and Paint-a-Smile Foundation, repainted the murals on the walls of the cardiology department at the Beijing Children's Hospital.

Shu was also Emporio Armani's Asian ambassador for its Fall/Winter 2010 collection. and is also the brand spokesperson for Bulgari in China. Since 2023, she has been announced as Global Brand Ambassador of Bulgari. In February 2023, Shu has been Global Spokesperson for American high-end fashion house Michael Kors. In March 2023, American luxury beauty brand Tom Ford Beauty announced Shu as their brand ambassador for Fragrance and Make-up for the China and Asia-Pacific regions.

Personal life
Shu married Hong Kong actor-director Stephen Fung in 2016. The two had met on the set of the romance drama Bishonen in 1997, and dated for four years.

Filmography

Film

Television series

Discography

Awards and nominations

References

External links

 
 
 Shu Qi at hkmdb
 Shu Qi at Chinesemov

1976 births
20th-century Hong Kong actresses
20th-century Taiwanese actresses
21st-century Hong Kong actresses
21st-century Taiwanese actresses
21st-century Taiwanese singers
21st-century Taiwanese women singers
Actresses from New Taipei
Best Actress Asian Film Award winners
Hong Kong Buddhists
Hong Kong film actresses
Hong Kong television actresses
Living people
Musicians from New Taipei
People with acquired permanent residency of Hong Kong
Taiwanese Buddhists
Taiwanese emigrants to Hong Kong
Taiwanese female models
Taiwanese film actresses
Taiwanese television actresses